Séamus Healy (born 9 August 1950) is a former Irish Independent politician who served as a Teachta Dála (TD) from 2000 to 2007 and 2011 to 2020.

He is part of the Clonmel-based Workers and Unemployed Action (WUA) which had a number of local representatives on South Tipperary County Council and Clonmel Borough Council. He is a former member of the League for a Workers Republic.

A former hospital administrator, Healy was first elected to Clonmel Borough Council in 1985. He was elected to the 28th Dáil at a by-election on 22 June 2000. He was re-elected at the 2002 general election, but lost his seat at the 2007 general election to Martin Mansergh of Fianna Fáil. After losing his Dáil seat, he returned to serve as a South Tipperary County Councillor for the Clonmel local electoral area, being co-opted for Pat English, after which he was appointed to various committees such as the local Vocational Education Committee, promotion of the Irish language and various water supply committees.

Healy was re-elected to South Tipperary County Council at the 2009 local elections.

He won back his seat at the 2011 general election with 21.3 per cent of the first preference vote.

On 15 December 2011, he helped launch a nationwide campaign against the household charge being brought in as part of the 2012 Irish budget.

He stood for re-election to the new Tipperary constituency as an Independent in the 2016 general election, and was elected on the seventh count. He voted for both Gerry Adams and Richard Boyd Barrett for Taoiseach when the 32nd Dáil first met.

Healy's brother Paddy Healy served as president of the Teachers' Union of Ireland and ran unsuccessfully in the Seanad elections in 2007 and 2011 for the NUI panel, and in the 1980s ran in the Dublin North-East constituency as an Anti H-Block candidate. He works as a voluntary researcher for Seamus.

Healy lost his seat at the 2020 general election.

References

1950 births
Living people
Independent TDs
Irish tax resisters
Local councillors in South Tipperary
Members of the 28th Dáil
Members of the 29th Dáil
Members of the 31st Dáil
Members of the 32nd Dáil
Politicians from County Tipperary